Michael A. Wadsworth (June 4, 1943 - April 28, 2004) was an all-star Canadian Football League defensive lineman, and later lawyer, QC, Canadian Ambassador to the Republic of Ireland, business executive, and television sports analyst.

Mike Wadsworth, one of six siblings born to Bernard "Bunny" and Catherine (née Kehoe) Wadsworth. He played high school football at De La Salle College (Toronto) before attending the University of Notre Dame on a football scholarship. Despite knee injuries, he won a monogram as a defensive tackle in 1964.

Wadsworth played professional football for the Toronto Argonauts from 1966 to 1970, during which time he also earned his law degree from Osgoode Hall Law School in Toronto. He was later named a 1968 Eastern All-Star.

In , Wadsworth became the second president of the Canadian Football League Players' Association (CFLPA).  He was the first active player to hold the position, retiring from the CFL and the CFLPA presidency at the start of the  season.

After his football days, he became a lawyer and QC. He completed the Advanced Management Program at Harvard Business School.  He was a football analyst on the CFL on CTV broadcasts. He was appointed Canadian Ambassador to Ireland in 1989 and named athletic director at Notre Dame in 1995. He served as an executive with Crownx, Inc.

His father starred for the Ottawa Rough Riders in 1940 and was voted to their half-century team in 1960.

Death
Mike Wadsworth died of bone and bladder cancer, aged 60, at the Mayo Clinic in Rochester, Minnesota. He was survived by his mother (Catherine), his wife (Bernadette), three daughters, and four siblings, and a large extended family.

See also
 Bernard Wadsworth

References

1943 births
2004 deaths
Canadian football people from Ottawa
Ambassadors of Canada to Ireland
Deaths from cancer in Minnesota
20th-century Canadian lawyers
Canadian football defensive linemen
Canadian Football League announcers
Canadian Football League Rookie of the Year Award winners
Canadian Roman Catholics
Deaths from bladder cancer
Deaths from bone cancer
Players of Canadian football from Ontario
Notre Dame Fighting Irish athletic directors
Notre Dame Fighting Irish football players
Toronto Argonauts players
Osgoode Hall Law School alumni